Christian Collovà is an Italian rally co-driver and Italian champion in the FIA Alternative Energies Cup. He is currently a lawyer.

Early life and education
Collovà was born in Koblenz, Germany and grew up in Paris, France.

He graduated from the University of Rome. Collovà is currently an entertainment lawyer.

Career
Along with rally driver Vincenzo Di Bella, Collovà was FIA Alternative Energies Cup runner-up in 2007, 2008 and 2010. In 2007 and 2008, he came in behind Giuliano Mazzoni as the World Championship runner-up.

In 2010, as the co-driver of the Citroën C5 along with driver Vincenzo Di Bella, Collovà won the Italian Championship. He was also the World Championship runner-up behind French rally driver Raymond Durand (driving a Toyota Prius) in the FIA Alternative Energies Cup, Additionally, he has won the Monza and Franciacorta races, and came in second place at the Green Prix EcoTarga Florio and Ecorally San Marino - Vaticano races.

Since 2015, Collovà serves on the Board of Directors of the Italian Chapter of Association Littéraire et Artistique Internationale (ALAI Italia), Since 2018, he serves on the Board of Directors of the Campania Region Film Commission Foundation.

Personal life
Collovà speaks Italian, French, and English.

See also
FIA Alternative Energies Cup
Vincenzo Di Bella
Massimo Liverani

References

Living people
1972 births
FIA E-Rally Regularity Cup drivers
Italian rally drivers